Malý or Maly may refer to:

People
 Arturo Maly (1939–2001), Argentine actor
 Dominik Malý (born 1996), Slovak footballer
 Gerő Mály (1884–1952), Hungarian actor
 Jakub Malý (1811–1885), Czech writer
 Josef Malý (1894–1943), Czech gymnast
 Joseph Karl Maly (1797–1866), Austrian botanist
 Leandro Maly (born 1976), Argentine volleyball player
 Matúš Malý (born 2001), Slovak footballer
 Michal Malý (born 1987), Czech footballer
 Paula Maly (1891–1974), Austrian painter
 Petr Malý (born 1984), Czech footballer
 Petrok Maly (died c. 1539), Italian architect
 Robin Malý (born 1989), Czech ice hockey player
 Theodore Maly (1894–1938), Soviet intelligence officer
 Ulrich Maly (born 1960), German politician
 Václav Malý (born 1950), Czech priest
 Vladimír Malý (born 1952), Czech high jumper

Places

Czech Republic
Malý Beranov, Jihlava District, Vysočina Region
Malý Bor, Klatovy District, Plzeň Region
Malý Újezd, Mělník District, Central Bohemian Region

Slovakia

Malý Krtíš, Veľký Krtíš District of the Banská Bystrica Region
Malý Horeš, Trebišov District in the Košice Region
Malý Kamenec, Trebišov District in the Košice Region
Malý Cetín, Nitra District in the Nitra Region
Malý Lapáš, Nitra District in the Nitra Region
Malý Lipník, Stará Ľubovňa District in the Prešov Region
Malý Šariš, Prešov District in the Prešov Region
Malý Slavkov, Kežmarok District in the Prešov Region
Malý Slivník, Prešov District in the Prešov Region
Malý Čepčín, Turčianske Teplice District in the Žilina Region

Other places
Maly Trostenets extermination camp, a village on the outskirts of Minsk, Belarus, and the site of a Nazi extermination camp
Maly Umys, a village in Kochkurovsky District of the Republic of Mordovia, Russia

Rivers
Maly Anyuy, a river in the Kolyma basin in the Russian Far East
Maly Chembar, a river of Penza Oblast, Russia
Maly Cheremshan, a river in Tatarstan and Ulyanovsk Oblast, Russia
Maly Irgiz, a river in Saratov Oblast, Russia
Maly Kundysh, a river in Mari El, Russia,
Maly Volkhovets, an eastern armlet of the Volkhov River in Russia
Maly Uzen, a river in Saratov Oblast of Russia and West Kazakhstan Province of Kazakhstan

Other geographic features
Maly Lyakhovsky Island, an island in the Laptev Sea, Russian Arctic
Maly Payalpan, a shield volcano on Kamchatka Peninsula, Russia
Maly Semyachik, a stratovolcano on Kamchatka Peninsula, Russia
Maly Taymyr Island, an island in the Laptev Sea, Russian Arctic
Maly Vysotsky Island, an island in northwest Russia

Other
Maly Theatre (Moscow), a theater in Moscow, Russia

See also
 
 Malyi (disambiguation)
 Malley
 Maley
 Mally (disambiguation)

Surnames from nicknames